Abdulrahman Mohamed El-Sayed (born October 31, 1984) is an American politician, former public health professor, medical doctor, and civil servant currently serving as the director of the Department of Health, Human, and Veterans Services for Wayne County. He was a candidate in Michigan's 2018 Democratic gubernatorial primary election, placing second out of three candidates. In September 2018, he founded Southpaw Michigan, a political action committee, to help elect other progressive candidates in Michigan.

El-Sayed was executive director of the Detroit Health Department and Health Officer for the City of Detroit from 2015 to 2017. In 2017, he resigned as health director to run for governor. He was also formerly an assistant professor in the Department of Epidemiology at Columbia University.

He is a political contributor at CNN, the author of Healing Politics: A Doctor's Journey into the Heart of Our Political Epidemic and Medicare for All: A Citizen's Guide (co-authored with Micah Johnson), and the host of America Dissected with Dr. Abdul El-Sayed, a podcast about politics and public health produced by Crooked Media. In 2020, he served on the Joe Biden–Bernie Sanders Unity Task Force on health care.

Early life and education 
El-Sayed was born in the metro Detroit area to parents who emigrated to the United States from Egypt.

He grew up in the Detroit area with his father Mohamed El-Sayed and stepmother Jacqueline El-Sayed, a native of Gratiot County, Michigan. Both are engineers. His father grew up in Alexandria, Egypt, and emigrated to the United States to study engineering at Wayne State University. His mother, Fatten Elkomy, is a nurse practitioner in Missouri.

El-Sayed graduated in 2003 from Bloomfield Hills Andover High School, where he was a three-sport athlete—wrestling, football, and lacrosse—and a captain in the latter two. El-Sayed attended the University of Michigan, where he majored in biology and political science, and played on the men's club lacrosse team. He won the William Jennings Bryan Prize for Political Science, graduated with Highest Distinction, and delivered the student commencement speech in front of president Bill Clinton, who delivered the 2007 commencement address.

El-Sayed was awarded a full-tuition scholarship to attend the University of Michigan Medical School, where he completed his first two years of medical school. There he led a student medical mission to Peru and founded a student organization that raised money and coordinated community service for a local free clinic. As a second-year medical student, he declined a Marshall Scholarship and accepted a Rhodes Scholarship to attend Oriel College, Oxford, where he completed a PhD in public health in 2011. While at Oxford, he earned a full blue as captain of Oxford's men's lacrosse team. In 2014, he completed his MD at Columbia University College of Physicians and Surgeons and was funded by the Soros Fellowship for New Americans and Medical Scientist Training Program. El-Sayed did not complete a residency after medical school and is therefore not licensed to practice medicine.

Health career 
El-Sayed is the author of over 100 scholarly articles, abstracts, and book chapters on public health policy, social epidemiology, and health disparities. His essays on public health policy have also been published in The New York Times, CNN, The Hill, The Huffington Post, The Detroit News, and the Detroit Free Press.

Public health professor 
In 2014 El-Sayed joined the faculty at Columbia's Mailman School of Public Health as assistant professor in the department of epidemiology. He served as director of Columbia's Systems Science Program and Global Research Analytics for Population Health. As a researcher, he has authored over 100 scientific publications, including articles, commentaries, book chapters, and abstracts, about health disparities, birth outcomes, and obesity. His research has been cited over 700 times. He is the recipient of several research awards, including being named one of the Carnegie Council's Policy Innovators. He created and taught the Mailman School's first course on systems science and population health. He co-edited a textbook on the topic with Sandro Galea published in 2017 by Oxford University Press, "Systems Science and Population Health".

Health Director of Detroit 
In August 2015, Mayor Mike Duggan appointed El-Sayed Health Officer and Executive Director of the Detroit Health Department, making him, at 30 years old, the youngest health officer in a major US city at the time. In that role, he was charged with rebuilding the Detroit Health Department after government public health activities were provided by a nonprofit before the City of Detroit's municipal bankruptcy in 2012. On his first day on the job El-Sayed arrived at a small office space in the back of Detroit's parking department overseeing five employees. In his first year as director he led efforts to oppose increases in sulfur dioxide emissions by Marathon Petroleum's Southwest Refinery, which resulted in reductions in overall emissions. He also led efforts to test Detroit schools for lead in the wake of Flint's Water crisis, provide free glasses to children in Detroit city schools, and transform the city's troubled Animal Control department.

Because of his leadership on lead poisoning reduction, El-Sayed was appointed to the governor's statewide Childhood Lead Elimination Board. He also served on the State of Michigan's Public health Advisory Commission and the Advisory Committee to the US Secretary of Health & Human Services for Healthy People 2030.

In 2016 El-Sayed was named one of Crain's Detroit's "40 under 40", and "Public Official of the Year" by the Michigan League of Conservation Voters. In 2017 the University of Michigan awarded him a Bicentennial Alumni Award, awarded to 20 alumni "whose achievements carry on Michigan's traditions of intellectual creativity and academic endeavor, of civic engagement, and of national and international service."

Health Director of Wayne County

In December 2022, El-Sayed was named director of Wayne County's Department of Health, Human, and Veterans Services pending approval by the county commission. He assumed the role in March, 2023.

2018 gubernatorial campaign

On February 9, 2017, the Detroit News reported that El-Sayed would resign as health director to run for governor of Michigan in the 2018 Democratic Party primary. He officially announced his candidacy on February 25, 2017. El-Sayed was inspired to run for governor following the Flint water crisis, saying: "I watched as Governor Snyder and his team of accountants were cutting costs and cutting corners. Their inattention to communities ultimately poisoned thousands of children - and those children were the very ones that I was serving at the helm of the health department. ... And that's something I didn't believe in. I believe in government as something we do in this country for the people and by the people".

El-Sayed pledged not to accept any campaign donations from corporations, and raised over $5 million from individual donations.

El-Sayed was endorsed by U.S. Senator Bernie Sanders, Democratic congressional nominee and democratic socialist activist Alexandria Ocasio-Cortez, and 2017 Women's March organizer Linda Sarsour. He was also endorsed by the organization Justice Democrats and The Nation magazine. In the August 7 primary, he received 340,560 votes, or about 30% of the vote, thus losing to Gretchen Whitmer.

In September 2018, El-Sayed launched a political action committee, Southpaw MI PAC, to support liberal down-ballot candidates and take positions on ballot initiatives.

Personal life 
El-Sayed lives in Ann Arbor with his wife, Sarah Jukaku, a psychiatrist.

References

External links
 
 

1984 births
American democratic socialists
American epidemiologists
American Muslims
American people of Egyptian descent
American Rhodes Scholars
Alumni of Oriel College, Oxford
Andover High School (Michigan) alumni
Candidates in the 2018 United States elections
Columbia University Vagelos College of Physicians and Surgeons alumni
Living people
Michigan Democrats
Physicians from Detroit
University of Michigan College of Literature, Science, and the Arts alumni